Pan Lina (born 18 July 1977) is a Chinese former football midfielder who played the China women's national football team. She participated at the 2000 Summer Olympics, but did not play. She participated at the 2003 Women's World Cup, and 2007 Women's World Cup.

References

External links
 
 

1977 births
Living people
Chinese women's footballers
Place of birth missing (living people)
Footballers at the 2000 Summer Olympics
Women's association football midfielders
Asian Games medalists in football
Footballers at the 2002 Asian Games
Footballers at the 2006 Asian Games
China women's international footballers
Asian Games silver medalists for China
Asian Games bronze medalists for China
Medalists at the 2002 Asian Games
Medalists at the 2006 Asian Games
2007 FIFA Women's World Cup players
2003 FIFA Women's World Cup players
Olympic footballers of China